January 1: Public Domain Day (International, applies in Israel)
January 1: Novy God Day (Russian-Jewish community)
March 6: European Day of the Righteous 
April 25-28: Ziyarat al-Nabi Shu'ayb (public holiday in Israel, Druze minority) 
May 9: Victory Day (9 May) (Public holiday in Israel) 
June 30: Navy Day (Israel)
July 17: International Firgun Day 
August 23: European Day of Remembrance for Victims of Stalinism and Nazism 
First Sunday in September: Federal Day of Thanksgiving, Repentance and Prayer (Germany, interfaith observance) 
September 9: Day of the Victims of Holocaust and of Racial Violence (Slovakia)
November 4: Yitzhak Rabin Memorial (Israel, unofficial, but widely commemorated)
Movable in November: Mitzvah Day International 2020 date: November 15
November 30: Day to Mark the Departure and Expulsion of Jews from the Arab Countries and Iran (Israel)
December 4: Eid il-Burbara (Israel/Palestinian territories , not an official holiday)
December 24: Nittel Nacht
December 31: Novy God Eve (Russian-Jewish community)

See also
List of observances set by the Hebrew calendar 
List of Gregorian Palestinian-related observances
Holocaust Memorial Days

References
 

Jewish-related and Israeli holidays
Gregorian calendar
Public holidays in Israel